Walter Augustin Villiger (1872–1938; his first name is sometimes spelt Walther) was a Swiss astronomer and Carl Zeiss engineer who discovered an asteroid while working in Munich, Germany. He also participated in the observation of comets.

His astronomical period of activity extended from 1896 to 1907. In 1924, less than a year after the first planetarium had been opened at the Deutsches Museum in Munich, Walther Villiger suggested a new, improved Zeiss planetarium projector. This new Zeiss, known as the Mark II, was designed for much larger theatres than the previous model —up to 23 metres .

Asteroid 1310 Villigera is named after him.

References 
 

1872 births
1938 deaths
19th-century Swiss astronomers
20th-century Swiss astronomers
Discoverers of asteroids